Estádio Coronel Emílio Gomes is a multi-use stadium located in Irati, Brazil. It is used mostly for football matches and hosts the home matches of Iraty Sport Club. The stadium has a maximum capacity of 8,000 people and was built in 1950.

External links
Templos do Futebol

Coronel Emilio Gomes
Sports venues in Paraná (state)
Irati, Paraná